Katie Emily Bray (born 23 January 1987) is an English mezzo-soprano and is best known as the winner of the Dame Joan Sutherland Audience Prize at the BBC Cardiff Singer of the World in 2019. She is particularly noted for her baroque repertoire.

Early life and education

Bray was born on 23 January 1987 in Exeter, Devon, England. She was educated at St Margaret's School in Exeter until 2005 and went on to study at the University of Manchester, graduating in 2008. She then went onto study opera as a post-graduate at the Royal Academy of Music, where she was taught by Elizabeth Ritchie and Iain Ledingham, and finished her studies at the academy in 2012 having won an Alfred Alexander Scholarship and  been recipient of The Karaviotis Scholarship.

Professional career

In 2013, Bray made her debuts with Glyndebourne Festival Opera and English Touring Opera. Bray has also performed with Opera North, English National Opera, Scottish Opera, Welsh National Opera, Garsington Opera, Opera Holland Park, English Touring Opera and Irish National Opera. Bray has also performed in concert halls and festivals around the United Kingdom, such as Wigmore Hall, Cadogan Hall, the Holywell Music Room and St George's, Hanover Square. She has also performed recitals in many song festivals that include the City of London Festival, the London English Song Festival and the Oxford Lieder Festival.

Repertoire

Competitions and awards

Discography
Bray appears on 
 David Matthews: Symphony No. 7 & Vespers (2014)
 Mahler: Lieder eines fahrenden Gesellen (arr. Schoenberg) (2015) 
 Rückert Lieder: Robert & Clara Schumann (2016)

See also
List of Royal Academy of Music people
List of mezzo-sopranos in non-classical music

References

External links 
 Katie Bray on the Bach Cantatas Website
 Katie Bray on the Rayfield Allied website

1987 births
Living people
Musicians from Exeter
Operatic mezzo-sopranos
21st-century British women opera singers
English mezzo-sopranos
Alumni of the University of Manchester
Alumni of the Royal Academy of Music